Isaurus is a genus of the cnidarian phylum within the family of Zoanthidae.

Distribution 
Commonly found in the outer edges and water-break zones of reefs around Belize and Fiji, but has been observed at sublittoral zones near Australia.

Reproduction 
Polyps tend to be solitary or in small clusters and tend to only open at night.

Species 
 Isaurus aggregatus Gray, 1828
 Isaurus clavatus Gray, 1828
 Isaurus cliftoni Gray, 1867
 Isaurus gelatinosus Pax, 1924
 Isaurus maculatus Muirhead & Ryland, 1985
 Isaurus natans Gray, 1828
 Isaurus savignii Gray, 1828
 Isaurus tuberculatus Gray, 1828

References 

Zoanthidae
Hexacorallia genera